Nazar is the first album by guitarist Joe Chawki, in collaboration with musician Hodge Gjonbalaj.

Track listing

Personnel
Joe Chawki – guitar
Hodge Gjonbalaj – production, rhythm guitar "Adrift in Time"

References

External links
Interview at The Instrumental Guitarist

2015 albums